Hae Min Lee (born October 15, 1980) was a Korean-American high school student who was last seen alive on January 13, 1999, in Baltimore County, Maryland. Her body was found four weeks later in Leakin Park; she had been killed by manual strangulation.

Lee's ex-boyfriend, Adnan Masud Syed (born May 21, 1981), was initially convicted of first-degree murder and sentenced to life in prison plus 30 years. In 2014, the podcast Serial covered the killing, which brought renewed attention to the case. In 2016, Judge Martin P. Welch vacated Syed's conviction and ordered a new trial. That decision was upheld by the Maryland Court of Special Appeals in 2018, but overturned by the Maryland Court of Appeals in 2019. Following an investigation by prosecutors that uncovered new evidence, a judge again vacated Syed's conviction in September 2022. On October 11, 2022, prosecutors announced that the charges against Syed had been dropped, effectively exonerating him.

Background and disappearance 
Hae Min Lee was born in South Korea in 1980 and emigrated with her mother Youn Kim and her brother Young Lee to the United States in 1992 to live with her grandparents. Lee attended the magnet program at Woodlawn High School near Baltimore, Maryland. She was an athlete who played lacrosse and field hockey.

Lee disappeared on January 13, 1999. Her family reported her missing after she failed to pick up her younger cousin from daycare around 3:15 p.m. Lee had attended Woodlawn High School that day and had been seen by several people leaving the campus at the end of the school day.

Baltimore police immediately began investigating her disappearance. On that day, officers called various friends of Lee to try to find her. They reached Adnan Syed, who was a former boyfriend, early around 6:30 p.m. that evening; he said the last time he saw her was around the time classes ended at school. At 1:30 a.m., they reached her boyfriend, who said he had not seen her that day. On February 6, a dog-led search was conducted around Woodlawn High School.

Homicide investigation 
Lee's partially buried body was discovered by a passerby in Leakin Park in Baltimore on February 9. Police attention became focused on the person who reported finding the body. The Baltimore City Police Homicide Division received an anonymous phone call on February 12 suggesting that the investigators should focus on Lee's ex-boyfriend and classmate, Adnan Syed. One of Syed's friends, Jay Wilds, told the police that Syed had expressed intentions of killing Lee and stated that he had helped Syed bury Lee's body after Syed confessed to killing her on January 13. 

Baltimore Police applied for cellular phone records for a phone belonging to Syed on February 16. Syed was arrested on February 28, and charged with first-degree murder.

Trials and conviction 
Syed's family hired defense attorney Cristina Gutierrez to represent him. Syed's first trial began in December 1999, but ended in a mistrial after only three days. Jurors accidentally overheard a sidebar dispute between Gutierrez and the presiding judge; Gutierrez interpreted a statement by the judge as tantamount to accusing her of lying and said as much — unaware that members of the jury were within earshot. After learning the jury had overheard this exchange, the judge granted Gutierrez's motion for a mistrial.

Syed's second trial began in January and lasted six weeks. On February 25, 2000, the jury found Syed guilty of first degree murder, kidnapping, false imprisonment, and robbery. Syed was sentenced to life in prison plus 30 years and Syed's family immediately fired Gutierrez following the verdict.

Appeals 
Syed appealed his conviction in 2003, which was unsuccessful. He later made an appeal for post-conviction relief in 2010, based on ineffective assistance of counsel. This was based on Gutierrez's failure to investigate an alibi witness, Asia McClain, who maintained she was talking with Syed in the library at the exact time that prosecutors said Syed attacked Lee in a Best Buy parking lot several miles away. "The judge had ruled that Gutierrez's decision not to call McClain as a witness was part of her defense strategy rather than an act of incompetence. The judge said the letters McClain sent Syed in jail were weak and possibly damaging evidence for the defense, since they did not state the time she saw him at the library and contradicted Syed's own account from that day". This appeal was initially denied in 2014.

On February 6, 2015, the Maryland Court of Special Appeals approved Syed's application for permission to appeal for a potential hearing on the admissibility of the alibi testimony of Asia McClain.

On May 18, 2015, the Maryland Court of Special Appeals remanded the case to the Circuit Court for Baltimore City. Syed's lawyer, C. Justin Brown, filed a motion on August 24, 2015, saying that a newly recovered document showed that the cell tower evidence used by prosecutors was misleading and should not have been admitted at trial. Additionally, prosecutors have said that two other suspects have arisen in the case, though their names have not been released.

On November 6, 2015, Baltimore City Circuit Court Judge Martin Welch ordered that Syed's post-conviction relief proceedings, to determine his eligibility for a new trial, be re-opened, "in the interests of justice for all parties". The post-conviction relief hearing, originally scheduled to last two days, lasted five days from February 3 to February 9, 2016. The hearing was attended by people from across the United States, including Sarah Koenig. Asia McClain testified that she talked to Syed at the library on January 13, 1999.

On June 30, 2016, Welch granted Syed's request for a new trial and vacated his conviction, ruling that Gutierrez "rendered ineffective assistance when she failed to cross-examine the state's expert regarding the reliability of cell tower location evidence". Welch denied Syed's defense team's motion for bail for Syed in the interim.

On March 29, 2018, the Maryland Court of Special Appeals, the second-highest court in the state, upheld Syed's request for a new trial. The Court of Special Appeals' opinion said that Syed's counsel failed to contact a potential alibi witness who could "have raised a reasonable doubt in the mind of at least one juror". Prosecutors and Attorney General Brian Frosh asked the Court of Special Appeals to reverse the lower court's ruling, and argued that "Syed's defense attorney did a thorough job and the witness, Asia McClain, would not have changed the outcome of the case."

The prosecution appealed to the Maryland Court of Appeals, the highest court in the state. On March 8, 2019, in a split 4–3 ruling, the Court of Appeals reversed the findings of the lower courts, denying Syed's request for a new trial. While the Court agreed Syed's legal counsel was deficient, they found it was not enough to have swayed the jury to change their decision, because the evidence against him was so strong. It "does little more than call into question the time that the state claimed Ms. Lee was killed and does nothing to rebut the evidence establishing Mr. Syed's motive and opportunity to kill Ms. Lee". The Court also ruled that Syed had waived his right to reexamine the validity of the cellphone tower evidence because the issue had not been raised as part of his original petition.

On November 25, 2019, the Supreme Court of the United States rejected Syed's appeal for a new trial. Maryland Attorney General Brian Frosh responded to the Supreme Court's decision by stating "the evidence linking Syed to Lee's death is 'overwhelming'" and in a statement: "We remain confident in the verdict that was delivered by the jury and are pleased that justice for Hae Min Lee has been done".

Aftermath

Serial podcast 

From October 3 to December 18, 2014, the murder of Hae Min Lee and the subsequent arrest and trial of Adnan Syed was the subject of the first season of the podcast Serial. It was developed by the creators of This American Life and hosted by Sarah Koenig. The podcast episodes generated international interest in the trial and were downloaded more than 100 million times by June 2016.

DNA testing 
After the podcast Serial ended in 2014, there were discussions by the Innocence Project about conducting DNA testing of the physical evidence collected in 1999. Documents obtained by The Baltimore Sun in early 2019 show that Maryland prosecutors tested multiple items tied to the murder in mid-2018 and Syed's DNA did not match any of the DNA present.

On March 10, 2022, the Baltimore City State's Attorney signed on to a motion filed by Syed's defense attorney, Erica J. Suter, requesting that the court order new DNA testing on Lee's clothing, shoes, and rape kit. The joint motion stated that those items had never been tested for DNA. On March 14, a city judge ordered that the Baltimore police send evidence to the Forensic Analytical Crime Lab in Hayward, California, within 15 days.

Follow-up 
In 2015, attorneys Rabia Chaudry, Susan Simpson, and Collin Miller began producing a podcast called Undisclosed: The State vs. Adnan Syed. Chaudry says she is Syed's friend from childhood and strongly believes in his innocence, while Simpson and Miller became interested in the case from listening to Serial. This podcast involved a detailed examination of the State of Maryland's case against Adnan Syed. Simpson also persuaded Abraham Waranowitz to sign an affidavit saying his original testimony was incorrect; he had been an expert witness in relation to cellphone locations.

Investigation Discovery aired a one-hour special called Adnan Syed: Innocent or Guilty? on June 14, 2016, based on a new analysis of evidence brought up in the podcasts.

In 2016, two books were published about the case. Confessions of a Serial Alibi, written by Asia McClain Chapman, was released on June 7, 2016, and Adnan's Story: The Search for Truth and Justice After Serial, written by Rabia Chaudry, was released on August 9, 2016.

In May 2018, HBO announced it would produce a four-hour documentary based on the murder case called The Case Against Adnan Syed. The first part of a four-part series was released on March 10, 2019. The HBO documentary revealed that Syed turned down a plea bargain in 2018 that would have required him to plead guilty in exchange for a shortened sentence.

In a February 2016 statement, Lee's family remained convinced of Syed's guilt, saying that it is now "more clear than ever" that he killed their daughter.

Vacated conviction

Prosecutors from Baltimore investigated Syed's case, declaring that new evidence they uncovered undermined Syed's conviction. They filed a motion on September 15, 2022, to vacate his conviction, citing Brady violations from prosecutors who worked on the case decades ago. On September 19, Circuit Court Judge Melissa Phinn vacated Syed's conviction. He was released from prison the same day. On October 11, prosecutors filed nolle prosequi with the court to drop all charges against Syed.

References

External links 
 "Serial Podcast", Season one
 "Undisclosed Podcast", Season one
 "Truth and Justice Podcast", Season one
 Hae Min Lee at Find a Grave

1990s missing person cases
1999 in Maryland
1999 murders in the United States
January 1999 events in the United States
Deaths by strangulation in the United States
Female murder victims
Formerly missing people
Missing person cases in Maryland
People murdered in Maryland
History of women in Maryland
Baltimore County, Maryland